"Jukebox in My Mind" is a song written by Dave Gibson and Ronnie Rogers, and recorded by American country music group Alabama. It was released in July 1990 as the second single from their album Pass It On Down. The song reached number one on the Billboard Hot Country Songs in the United States and the defunct RPM country music charts in Canada.

Content
The song uses a jukebox as a metaphor for the memories within the narrator's mind. It is composed in the key of B-flat major with a moderate tempo and 4/4 time signature.

Critical reception
An uncredited review in Stereo Review magazine of Pass It On Down described "Jukebox in My Mind" as "a fine song in the pure honky-tonk mold...which lead singer Randy Owen delivers in his best Merle Haggard syntax. The tune is vastly different from anything else the band has recorded". In 1991, the Academy of Country Music nominated the song for Single of the Year.

Chart performance

Year-end charts

References

Alabama (American band) songs
1990 singles
Songs written by Ronnie Rogers
Songs written by Dave Gibson (American songwriter)
Song recordings produced by Josh Leo
RCA Records Nashville singles
1990 songs
Songs about country music
Songs about jukeboxes